Acaulospora walkeri is a species of fungus in the family Acaulosporaceae. It forms arbuscular mycorrhiza and vesicles in roots. It is found in Indonesia, where it associates with Theobroma cacao.

References

Diversisporales
Fungi described in 1990
Fungi of Asia